The Ferro River is a river of Mato Grosso state in western Brazil. It flows northeast, receives the Steinen River from the south, enters the Xingu Indigenous Park, receives the combined Ronuro and Jatoba rivers from the south and joins the Xingu River which flows north into the Amazon.

See also
List of rivers of Mato Grosso

References
Brazilian Ministry of Transport

Rivers of Mato Grosso
Rivers of Xingu Indigenous Park